During the 1995–96 English football season, Reading F.C. competed in the Football League First Division, following missing out on promotion to the Premier League the previous season.

Squad

Out on loan

Left club during season

Transfers

In

Loans In

Out

Loans out

Released

Competitions

First Division

Results

League table

FA Cup

League Cup

Squad statistics

Appearances and goals

|-
|colspan="14"|Players away on loan:

|-
|colspan="14"|Players who appeared for Reading but left during the season:

|}

Goal Scorers

Team kit
Reading's kit for the 1995–96 was manufactured by Pelada, and the main sponsor was Auto Trader.

Notes

References

Soccerbase.com

Reading F.C. seasons
Reading